Ruth Rubin (September 1, 1906 – June 11, 2000) was a Canadian-American folklorist, singer, poet, and scholar of Yiddish culture and music.

Early life
Born Rivke Rosenblatt in 1906 in Montreal, she grew up speaking Yiddish, English and French. Her parents had immigrated to Canada from Bessarabia, then part of the Russian Empire; she had at least one sibling, a sister Esther. She attended the city's public schools, as well as the Peretz Shule, a secular Yiddish school, where she saw Sholom Aleichem speak in 1915 and was deeply affected. In 1924, she moved to New York where she studied music and attended night school at Hunter College while working as a secretary and stenographer.

Contributions
Around 1935 Rubin decided to become a Yiddish folklorist and sought out Chaim Zhitlowsky (1865–1943), a prominent Yiddish scholar and writer for guidance. She began her research at the YIVO Institute for Jewish Research, the New York Public Library and the archives of the Jewish Theological Seminary. In addition to teaching music and poetry in Yiddish schools in the city, she also began publishing in journals. During World War II, she translated Yiddish diaries that were smuggled out of European ghettos and concentration camps.

From about 1947 on, Rubin began to conduct serious fieldwork within the Jewish community of immigrants in New York City, Montreal and Toronto, focusing on the displaced persons who had arrived from Europe following the Holocaust.

Rubin's work is considered deeply significant as she began gathering folksong and Yiddish folktales at a time when there was very little interest in Yiddish culture. She gathered thousands of songs over the next twenty years from a generation of survivors who had nearly been annihilated by Nazism and later Stalinist repression. In tandem with this work, Rubin continued her studies in Yiddish language and history with scholar Max Weinreich.

In addition to her work as a collector, Rubin also organized and performed in recitals of Yiddish folksongs and hosted salons in her Grammercy Park Avenue apartment. As part of the folk revival movement, she performed at New York's Town Hall and Carnegie Recital Hall, participated in Expo 67, and appeared in folk concerts with Pete Seeger, Paul Robeson and Ronnie Gilbert. She was also heavily involved in the Jewish Music Forum and the National Jewish Music Council and fostered international scholarly relations with folklorists in Israel and Europe.

Legacy
Irene Heskes (1923–1999) praised Rubin's "prodigious dedication" to collecting and preserving Yiddish culture and song, ranking her as one of the leading Yiddish collector-scholars of the twentieth century. Rubin's performance style was described as "simple and unaffected" and contemporaries report that she saw performance more as an act of cultural transmission rather than artistic expression.

Rubin recorded many of the songs she collected and was a recording artist from the 1940s through to the 1980s. Often working Moses Asch, she also released several collections under Oriole and her own imprint. She recorded collaborations with Pete Seeger, Fred Hellerman, Dick Weissman and Hedy West.

Rubin deposited her field recordings in various archives and research libraries in the United States (Library of Congress, YIVO, Wayne State University), Canada (Canadian Museum of History), and Israel, where they now constitute important archival research collections. Fellow scholars such as Steven Zeitlin of the New York Center for Urban Folk Culture praised Rubin's work as she collected songs from informants who had learned songs in their original context.

Personal life
In 1932, Rosenblatt married Harry Rubin. The two had a son named Michael in 1937, who passed away in 1959. Her husband died in 1971. She died in 2000.

Awards
 Lifetime Achievement Award, Yiddish Folk Arts Program 1989

Selected bibliography

Selected discography

References

External links
Ruth Rubin archive of Yiddish Folksongs, YIVO Institute for Jewish Research
Ruth Rubin holdings at Wayne State University Archives (part of the People's Song Library)
Ruth Rubin papers at the Library of Congress
Ethnographic recordings available online from the Ruth Rubin collection of Jewish folksongs, Israeli National Library, National Sound Archive
Ruth Rubin: A Life in Song (1986 documentary)

1906 births
2000 deaths
Canadian emigrants to the United States
Canadian folklorists
Women folklorists
Jewish folklorists
Canadian women folk singers
Jewish folklore
Yiddish-language folklore
Yiddish-language music
Yiddish-language singers
Yiddish–English translators
Yiddish-language poets
20th-century translators